Ranibandh Assembly constituency is an assembly constituency in Bankura district in the Indian state of West Bengal. It is reserved for scheduled tribes.

Overview
As per orders of the Delimitation Commission, No. 249 Ranibandh Assembly constituency (ST) is composed of the following: Ranibandh, Hirbandh and Khatra community development blocks.

Ranibandh  Assembly constituency  is part of No. 36 Bankura (Lok Sabha constituency).

Election results
2016

2011

.# Trinamool Congress did not contest this seat in 2006.

1977-2006
In the 2006 state assembly elections, Deblina Hembram of CPI(M) won the Ranibandh assembly seat defeating her nearest rival Aditya Kisku of Jharkhand Party (Naren). Contests in most years were multi cornered but only winners and runners are being mentioned. Makar Tudu of CPI(M) defeated Gopinath Saren of JMM in 2001. Deblina Hembram of CPI(M) defeated Anil Hansda of Congress in 1996. Arati Hembram of CPI(M) defeated Sudarsan Baskey of Congress in 1991. Rampada Mandi of CPI(M) defeated Chandra Mohan Murmu of Congress in 1987, Jaleswar Saren, Independent, in 1982. Suchand Soren of CPI(M) defeated Jadunath Murmu of Janata Party in 1977.

1962-1972
Amala Saren of Congress won in 1972. Suchand Saren of CPI(M) won in 1971 and 1969. B. Hembran of Congress in 1967. Jaleswar Hansda of CPI won in 1962. Prior to that the Ranibandh seat did not exist.

References

Assembly constituencies of West Bengal
Politics of Bankura district